Crimson is an album by the Finnish metal band Sentenced, released in January 2000 on Century Media. The album artwork was done by Niklas Sundin of Dark Tranquillity. Coincidentally, Dark Tranquillity recorded a cover version of the song "Broken", released as a track on Century Media: Covering 20 Years of Extremes.

Track listing

Credits 
 Ville Laihiala – vocals
 Miika Tenkula – guitar
 Sami Lopakka – guitar
 Sami Kukkohovi – bass
 Vesa Ranta – drums

Notes 
The digipak version and the 2007 reissue both contain the video for "Killing Me Killing You".

References 

2000 albums
Sentenced albums
Century Media Records albums